Nathalie Lawhead is an independent net artist and video game designer residing in Irvine, California.

Life and career
Lawhead's background is in net art. Their work often invokes the iconography of 1990s-era web design and computing, particularly moments of technical failure, including pixelated lo-fi imagery, glitches, pop-up ads, and error messages. Lawhead's Tetrageddon Games is a compilation of short experimental games that playfully subvert norms of taste in web and game aesthetics.  Their more recent project, Everything is Going to be OK, was described by Lawhead as an "interactive zine,"  and combines short poems, games, and animations to express personal experiences with trauma.

Harassment
Lawhead was subjected to online and offline abuse and harassment following their discussion of their game Everything is Going to be OK at Double Fine's Day of the Devs event, which increased after they published an article,  "YouTube Culture is Turning Kids Against Art Games", on Venture Beat, where they discussed experiences with harassment. As a result, Lawhead further revised and expanded Everything is Going to be OK to include these experiences and comment on how gaming culture, and culture in general, enables abusers.

In 2019, Lawhead went public with rape allegations against video game composer Jeremy Soule.

Notable works

Awards
 2015 - Winner, IGF Nuovo Award for Tetrageddon Games
 2017 - Winner, Indiecade Interaction Award for Everything is Going to Be OK
 2017 - Winner, A MAZE Digital Moment Award for Everything is Going to be OK
 2018 - Finalist, IGF Nuovo Award for Everything is Going to Be OK
 2018 - Honorable Mention, IGF Seamus McNally Grand Prize for Everything is Going to Be OK

References

External links
 
 

American video game designers
indie video game developers
internet art
living people
women video game developers
year of birth missing (living people)